Mary Sean Young (born November 20, 1959) is an American actress. She is particularly known for working in sci-fi films, although she has performed roles in a variety of genres. 

Young's early roles include the independent romance Jane Austen in Manhattan (1980) and the comedy feature Stripes (1981), the latter being a commercial success. Her breakthrough role was that of Rachael in the sci-fi Blade Runner (1982), which emerged as a significant work in popular culture; she reprised the role for Blade Runner's acclaimed sequel Blade Runner 2049 (2017). She originated the character of Chani in the sci-fi Dune (1984), led the neo-noir No Way Out (1987), played Kate in Wall Street (1987), and had starring roles in the comedies Fatal Instinct (1993) and Ace Ventura: Pet Detective (1994).

Early life
Young was born in Louisville, Kentucky, the daughter of Donald Young, Jr., a television producer and journalist, and Lee Guthrie (born Mary Lee Kane), a screenwriter, public relations executive, and journalist Young attended Cleveland Heights High School in Cleveland Heights, Ohio, but did not graduate. This was followed by the Interlochen Arts Academy in Interlochen, Michigan. She also attended the School of American Ballet in New York City. Before becoming an actress, Young worked as a model and ballet dancer.

Career

Young began her film career in Jane Austen in Manhattan (1980), followed by a role in the film Stripes (1981). She then played the female lead, Rachael, alongside Harrison Ford in the classic science fiction film Blade Runner (1982). On television, Young played the female lead opposite Lenny Von Dohlen in Under the Biltmore Clock (1986), based on F. Scott Fitzgerald's story Myra Meets His Family. The following year, she had a small role in the film Wall Street (1987) as the wife of Michael Douglas's character, Gordon Gekko. Her role was originally intended to be larger, but was significantly reduced due to clashes with Oliver Stone.

One of Young's most prominent roles was as the lover of a ruthless Washington politician (Gene Hackman) in No Way Out (also 1987), alongside Kevin Costner. Her other credits include Dune (1984) (playing Paul Atreides's love interest Chani), Baby: Secret of the Lost Legend (1985) and Fatal Instinct (1993). Young appeared in The Boost (1988), with James Woods. She was next cast as Vicki Vale in Tim Burton's film Batman (1989), but during rehearsals, she broke her arm after falling off a horse and was replaced by Kim Basinger. In an unsuccessful attempt to win the role of Catwoman (which was originally offered to Annette Bening but, after Bening became pregnant, Michelle Pfeiffer was cast) in the sequel Batman Returns (1992), Young constructed a homemade Catwoman costume and attempted to contact Burton and actor Michael Keaton during production. She appeared on The Joan Rivers Show in character as the Catwoman, campaigning for the role and making a plea to Tim Burton.

Young was cast as Tess Trueheart in the movie Dick Tracy (1990). However, she was dismissed in favor of Glenne Headly for not appearing maternal in the role. Young later said her dismissal was punishment for her having rebuffed Warren Beatty's advances, a statement Beatty denies. In 1991, she was awarded the Worst Actress and the Worst Supporting Actress Razzies for her roles in A Kiss Before Dying. She played a supporting role in the comedy Ace Ventura: Pet Detective (1994). She also played Helen Hyde in the comedy Dr. Jekyll and Ms. Hyde (1995).

During most of the 1990s, she resided in Sedona, Arizona, and her career cooled. Young reprised her role as Rachael in the Blade Runner video game released in 1997.  Young has appeared in independent films, including roles in Poor White Trash (2000), Mockingbird Don't Sing (2001), and Sugar & Spice (also 2001). She spent four months in Russia filming the miniseries Yesenin (2005), in which she portrayed the dancer Isadora Duncan. 

In 2008, Young competed in the television program Gone Country 2, which included a competition in a celebrity demolition derby at the Henry County Fairgrounds in Paris, Tennessee. Young went on to win the celebrity derby heat and then went on to compete against 21 professional demolition derby drivers. Young finished in fourth place. Young appeared on The Young and the Restless in June 2010 as Canadian barmaid Meggie McClain, alongside good friend Eric Braeden. She returned to the show on July 14 in a recurring role, which lasted through February 2011.

In 2010, she was cast on the first season of the ABC series Skating with the Stars as a celebrity contestant who skated with professional skater Denis Petukhov, but she was the first celebrity to be eliminated.

In October 2011, Young appeared on Late Show with David Letterman. During the interview, she described how she was now looking for movie work after raising her two sons, and produced a short video clip promoting her job search which Letterman played. She was subsequently cast in a film about Nikola Tesla, slated for release in 2013, titled Fragments From Olympus: The Vision of Nikola Tesla (unreleased as of April 2021).

In October 2013, Young played the role of Dr. Lucien in Star Trek: Renegades, a fan project to create a pilot for a new Star Trek series (released in August 2015) where several former Star Trek actors appeared, including  Tim Russ (who also directed the pilot) as well as Walter Koenig, Garrett Wang and J. G. Hertzler. In June 2013, Young performed in a benefit skating event at the Ice Theater of New York, competing in a Celebrity Skating competition against YouTube personality Michael Buckley, and US Olympic Fencing silver medalist Tim Morehouse.

Young reprised her 1982 role of Rachael for Blade Runner 2049 (2017), portraying both the original (using archival footage from the first film) and a brand new cloned version of the character. This was achieved through the use of another actress as a body double. Sean Young was also credited in the new film as acting coach to Loren Peta, the actress portraying her character.

Personal life
In 1990, Young married Robert Lujan, an actor and composer, with whom she has two sons. The couple divorced in 2002, but remarried in 2011. 

In January 2008, Young checked herself into rehabilitation for alcohol abuse. A later stay in rehab occurred in 2011, which was depicted on Celebrity Rehab with Dr. Drew, as were Lujan's visits to her.

In October 2017, Young joined the growing number of women who have alleged that producer Harvey Weinstein sexually harassed, sexually intimidated, and/or sexually assaulted them.

Legal issues 
In 1989, James Woods sued Young for harassing him and his then-fiancée, alleging that, in addition to other disruptive behavior, Young left a disfigured doll on his doorstep. She denied the allegations, and claimed that Woods filed the lawsuit out of spite. Young stated, "It was a crush being turned down, that's all .... So sue me! And he [Woods] did." The suit was settled out of court in 1989. Young was awarded $227,000 (equivalent to $ today) to cover her legal costs.

On February 26, 2012, during an after party for the 84th Academy Awards, Young was placed under citizen's arrest. It was alleged that she was asked to leave since she did not possess a ticket to enter. An argument ensued and resulted in Young slapping the security guard. Young stated she was not intoxicated and was well behaved, and that the security guard was the aggressor. The charges were later dropped.

In August 2018, Young and her son were identified on surveillance video removing two MacBook laptops from the Astoria, Queens production office for the film Charlie Boy. She was originally set to direct the film but was replaced by Timothy Hines, with co-writer Greg Kritikos saying "she was out of her depth." The laptops and production software on them were valued at $12,000, and the New York City Police Department sought her for questioning. The two laptops that Young was accused of stealing were returned a few days later, on August 14, through her attorney. No charges were filed. Young said it was a misunderstanding and she had permission to enter the offices to retrieve personal property that had been left there. Young released a statement the day after initial reports were posted, saying that she "gathered what I believed to be my property but later discovered I was mistaken" and had contacted members of the office to return the items. Those involved with the production denied Young had contacted them.

Filmography

Film

Television

Video games

See also
 List of people from the Louisville metropolitan area

References

External links

 
 
 
 
 John C. Tibbetts interviews Sean Young about Blade Runner in 1982

1959 births
Actresses from Louisville, Kentucky
American female dancers
Cleveland Heights High School alumni
Female models from Kentucky
American ballerinas
American film actresses
American television actresses
Interlochen Center for the Arts alumni
Living people
20th-century American actresses
21st-century American actresses